Repenka is a rural locality (a selo) and the administrative center of Repenskoye Rural Settlement, Alexeyevsky District, Belgorod Oblast, Russia. The population was 572 as of 2010. There are 6 streets.

Geography 
Repenka is located 24 km northeast of Alexeyevka (the district's administrative centre) by road. Khokhol-Trostyanka is the nearest rural locality.

References 

Rural localities in Alexeyevsky District, Belgorod Oblast
Biryuchensky Uyezd